Myanmar competed at the 2008 Summer Paralympics in Beijing, China. The country's delegation consisted of three competitors: swimmers Win San Aung and Naing Sit Aung and athlete Win Naing. Both Naing Sit Aung and Win Naing won three gold medals at the ASEAN ParaGames earlier in 2008.

Sports

Athletics

Swimming

Men

See also
Myanmar at the Paralympics
Myanmar at the 2008 Summer Olympics

References

Nations at the 2008 Summer Paralympics
2008
Paralympics